Konstantin Mikhaylovich Korzh (born 17 June 1996) is a Russian football player. He plays for FC Dynamo Stavropol.

Club career
He made his debut in the Russian Professional Football League for FC Saturn Ramenskoye on 8 August 2014 in a game against FC Domodedovo Moscow. He made his debut in the Russian Football National League for FC Torpedo Moscow on 27 February 2021 in a game against FC SKA-Khabarovsk.

References

External links
 Profile by Russian Football National League 2
 Profile by Russian Football National League
 

1996 births
Sportspeople from Moscow Oblast
Living people
Russian footballers
Association football forwards
FC Saturn Ramenskoye players
FC Torpedo Moscow players
FC Tom Tomsk players
FC Chayka Peschanokopskoye players
FC Dynamo Stavropol players
Russian First League players
Russian Second League players